Sandra Tiffany (born June 30, 1949) is an American politician who served in the Nevada Assembly from the 21st district from 1992 to 2002 and in the Nevada Senate from Clark County's 5th district from 2002 to 2006.

References

1949 births
Living people
Republican Party members of the Nevada Assembly
Republican Party Nevada state senators